The Sudogda is a river in the Vladimir Oblast of Russia, a right tributary of the Klyazma.

The Sudogda arises near the village Lazarevka in the south of the oblast and empties into the Klyazma near the village of Spas-Kupalische. It has an average slope of 0.342 m/km; half of the fall occurs in the first 20 kilometers. The river is wooded; the shore consists largely of meadows and swamps, particularly upstream. The general direction of flow is north.

On the river are the towns of Sudogda and Muromtsevo as well as a number of villages, and formerly several small hydropower plants.

References 

Rivers of Vladimir Oblast